The North Eastern Railway Class S2 - London and North Eastern Railway Class B15 - was a mixed-traffic 4-6-0 steam locomotive designed by Vincent Raven. The design was based on NER Class S.

Superheaters
The first seven was built with saturated (non-superheated) boilers, however the remaining thirteen were fitted with Robinson 24-element superheaters. The saturated B15s were eventually fitted with superheaters. Some of these rebuilds used Schmidt superheaters, however they were eventually converted to use Robinson superheaters, as Robinson superheaters were the LNER’s standard type of superheaters.

No.825
The last of the class, No.825 was fitted with Stumpf Uniflow cylinders. The inlet and exhaust ports were separate. Although the exhaust port was always the same size, the inlet port could vary in size according to the position of the cutoff. In 1918, the system was used on C7 No.2212, with a tidier result. Due to the special attention required for these experimental locomotives, in March 1924, the locomotive was rebuilt as a standard B15, matching the other members.

Performance
Although they were used on their suitable work, they steamed poorly if handled with crew who wasn’t used to the B15s (which also affected the B13s), and thus they were unpopular with crew who didn’t have enough experience on the B15s.

Accidents and incidents
On 14 February 1920, locomotive No. 787 was hauling a freight train which was involved in a head-on collision with a freight train hauled by locomotive No. 788 at Skelton, Yorkshire.

Withdrawal
Withdrawal commenced with No.788 in September 1937, and all were gone by December 1947, with the last being No.1696 (NER No.820). None were preserved.<ref name=BRdatabase</ref>

References

External links
 The Raven Class B15 (NER Class S2) 4-6-0s LNER Encyclopedia

4-6-0 locomotives
S2
Scrapped locomotives
Standard gauge steam locomotives of Great Britain
Railway locomotives introduced in 1911